The Global New Car Assessment Programme (Global NCAP) is a project of the Towards Zero Foundation, a UK-registered charity. The programme aims to promote the sale of safer cars in developing markets by empowering consumers with objective information about the safety of vehicles. Global NCAP supports the UN Sustainable Development Goals and the target to halve road deaths and injuries by 2030 (50 by 30), and the full implementation of the Global Plan for the UN's Decade (and Second Decade) of Action for Road Safety especially the recommended activities for vehicles.

Programs

Safer Cars for India 
In January 2014, Global NCAP released the first ever independent crash test results of five popular compact cars sold in the Indian market, starting their popular 'Safer Cars for India' project. The tests were based on 2013 Latin NCAP assessment protocol for adult occupant protection and 2010 Latin NCAP assessment protocol for child occupant protection. The results were shocking, with all five cars tested scoring zero stars for adult occupant protection due to the Hybrid III dummies recording a high risk of life-threatening injury to critical body regions in the frontal 64km/h 40% offset deformable barrier test. All but one car also failed the UN's regulatory requirements for frontal impact (ECE R94) at 56km/h with 40% offset against a deformable barrier. Qualitatively, this was attributed to the lack of airbags in all of the five cars tested, as well as poor structural integrity in three out of the five cars tested.

The first phase of results sparked international outrage, prompting manufacturers like Toyota and Volkswagen to make at least double frontal airbags a standard fitment across their model range in India. Positive market response also encouraged Global NCAP to continue testing cars for India in subsequent years. 

Global NCAP continued to test cars with very mixed results. The Government of India enforced UN equivalent crash test standards for the homologation of all new cars from 2017 and all existing cars from October 2019. This also resulted in cars scoring marginally better results.

Safer Cars for Africa 

In early 2020, Global NCAP conducted a car-to-car test between the South African Nissan NP300 Hardbody and a second-hand Nissan Navara from Europe. The second-hand European car was fitted with multiple airbags and Electronic Stability Control, and its passenger compartment maintained its integrity far better than the African car did. Nissan South Africa confirmed in early 2021 that production and sale of the NP300 in South Africa would come to an end.

Comparison groups 
The results are grouped into 2 increasingly demanding classes:

 2014-June 2022
 July 2022-2025

Criticism 
Since the start of its Safer Cars for India project, Global NCAP has faced criticism similar to that faced by other NCAP programs in their early phases.

After publication of the second round of results for the project, long-time admirer of the Datsun GO, Bertel Schmitt, published an article in The Daily Kanban accusing the FIA of having vested interests in starting the project. He accused Global NCAP of having double standards, questioning their use of a 64km/h test while C-NCAP (a Global NCAP member) still used a 50km/h test. It has since been noted that it is not possible to compare the two tests solely based on speed, because the 64km/h test uses an offset deformable barrier, while the 50km/h test is a full-width test into a rigid barrier, which is demanding on the vehicle's restraint systems.

The article also claimed that Global NCAP passed the basic version of the Ford Figo for the UN's Regulation 94 frontal crash test at 56km/h 'claiming it would have performed better if it had airbags'. However, Global NCAP had, in fact, conducted a full-scale R94 test on that model where dummy readings passed minimum UN limits because of the dummy narrowly failing to make contact with the steering wheel.

After the first round of Safer Cars for India crash test results, Nissan executive Vice President, Dr Andy Palmer, said in a statement to Autocar, "I think the people who criticise these cars for not meeting US or European crash standards are living in a dream world."

In 2014, after the Maruti Suzuki Swift in its basic safety specification received a zero-star crash test rating, Maruti Suzuki's Chairman, R. C. Bhargava, defended the result claiming that vehicle safety was not part of the safe systems approach and that the road fatalities in India were in no way linked to poor safety of the cars on sale in the market.

Consumers have criticised Global NCAP for the limited nature of the tests which, until mid-2022, use 2013 Latin NCAP protocols which only cover offset frontal impact. Global NCAP confirmed in an interview that they are budget-constrained and would update their assessment protocols when it was possible.

Consumers have raised doubts on the vehicle sponsorship procedure with worries that cars picked from early production before the market launch may not be representative of cars sold to consumers. Global NCAP confirmed with a note on their website that in case the cars are picked from early production, they are selected at random from the plant's distribution area (where cars are sent to dealers) and that the cars are hence representative of consumer cars.

It has also been pointed out on popular consumer forums that there have been ambiguities in the technical reports published for consumers to view.

Evidence suggests that the 64km/h frontal offset crash used by Global NCAP, that represents a car-to-car crash, covers a lower fraction of car-related collisions in India than it does in Europe, because of the higher frequency of car crashes in India with more aggressive crash partners like commercial vehicles or rigid, fixed objects.

References

External links 
 

Automotive safety